Bondarzewia is a widely distributed genus of fungi in the family Bondarzewiaceae. The genus was circumscribed by mycologist Rolf Singer in 1940.

References

Russulales
Russulales genera
Taxa named by Rolf Singer